Tholymis is a genus of medium-sized dragonflies in the family Libellulidae.
Species of Tholymis are tropical, active mostly at dawn and dusk.

Species
The genus Tholymis includes the following species:

References

Libellulidae
Anisoptera genera
Odonata of Asia
Odonata of Australia
Taxa named by Hermann August Hagen